Gibberula ovata is a species of sea snail, a marine gastropod mollusk, in the family Cystiscidae.

References

ovata
Gastropods described in 1951
Cystiscidae